Golthamajal  is a village in the southern state of Karnataka, India. It is located in the Bantwal taluk of Dakshina Kannada district in Karnataka. It is situated at a distance of 34 km towards the east of Mangalore city.

Demographics
 India census, Golthamajal had a population of 5777 with 2945 males and 2832 females.

See also
 Mangalore
 Dakshina Kannada
 Districts of Karnataka

References

External links
 http://dk.nic.in/

Villages in Dakshina Kannada district